"No Sleep Tonight" was the first single from British band the Faders, released by Polydor Records. It was released on 21 March 2005 and reached number 13 on the UK Singles Chart. It has also appeared on two soundtrack albums: the soundtrack to the television series Veronica Mars, and on the soundtrack to the film The Sisterhood of Traveling Pants. It also appears in the opening credits of ''She's the man (film)

After the announcement of the band's split in July 2006, Molly Lorenne (a former band member and now under the name Molly McQueen) has released the song as a solo artist.

References

External links
 Video for No Sleep Tonight on Google Videos

2005 singles
2005 songs
Polydor Records singles
Songs written by Mark Taylor (record producer)